Gegham Kadimyan (born 19 October 1992) is a professional Armenian footballer who plays as a winger or forward for Van.

Club career 
Kadimyan is the product of Armenian FC Pyunik Sportive School System where his first trainer was Serzh Sargsyan and FC Arsenal Kharkiv, where he joined in age 14. He spent large part of his career as a player in three clubs of the Ukrainian Second League and the Ukrainian First League.

In January 2014 he signed 2,5 years deal with Ukrainian Premier League's club FC Hoverla Uzhhorod.
After one and a half year in Donetsk, he signed for Karpaty Lviv in February 2016. His debut was with an assist against Dinamo Kiev.

International career 
At 23 years old he played his first international FIFA game, representing Armenia against Belarus. The game ended in a goalless draw and Gegham played the last 20 minutes on the left wing.

International goals
As of match played 1 June 2016. Armenia score listed first, score column indicates score after each Kadimyan goal.

References

External links
 
 
 

1992 births
Living people
People from Artashat, Armenia
Armenian footballers
Armenian expatriate footballers
Armenia international footballers
Ukrainian footballers
FC Arsenal Kharkiv players
FC Tytan Armyansk players
PFC Sumy players
FC Hoverla Uzhhorod players
FC Olimpik Donetsk players
FC Karpaty Lviv players
FC Zorya Luhansk players
FC Vorskla Poltava players
FC Arsenal Kyiv players
FC Alashkert players
FC Neman Grodno players
FC Kaisar players
FC Van players
Ukrainian Premier League players
Ukrainian First League players
Ukrainian Second League players
Armenian Premier League players
Belarusian Premier League players
Kazakhstan Premier League players
Association football forwards
Expatriate footballers in Ukraine
Expatriate footballers in Belarus
Expatriate footballers in Kazakhstan
Armenian expatriate sportspeople in Ukraine
Armenian expatriate sportspeople in Belarus
Armenian expatriate sportspeople in Kazakhstan